The Journey is a Japanese–Saudi Arabian animated action fantasy film directed by Kōbun Shizuno, written by Atsuhiro Tomioka and co-produced by Toei Animation and Manga Productions. The film, based on the Islamic historical event, the Year of the Elephant, revolves around a potter named Aus who joins a battle to defend his home city of Mecca. The film was released in Japan, the Middle East and North Africa in June 2021.

Premise
"As a ruthless invader threatens to enslave their people and destroy the Kaaba, a sacred sanctuary, the people of Mecca take up arms. Only able to muster a small force against the massive army, defeat seems all but inevitable. Aus, a seemingly simple potter fighting to protect his family, is forced to reveal his dark past when he discovers amongst the defenders a long-lost friend believed to be dead - a warrior named Zurara. As fear threatens to break their resolve, Aus' strength of faith compels him to stand and fight. Aus battles his own doubts and fears as he tries to unite his friends and compatriots on the eve of battle. Abraha's army is fast approaching, and the fate of Mecca and its people hangs in the balance. Will the people of Mecca defeat the colossal army with nothing but their simple defenses and their love for their city?"

Voice cast

Japanese voice cast
Tōru Furuya as Aus
Kotono Mitsuishi as Hind
Hiroshi Kamiya as Zurara
Kazuya Nakai as Musab
Takaya Kuroda as Abraha
Yuichi Nakamura as Nizar
Mugihito as Muttalib

Arabic voice cast
Nassar Al-Nassar as Aus
Rasha Rizk as Hind
Abdullah Elfiky as Zurara
Ahmed Al-Yazidi as Musab
Abdo Chahine as Abraha
Abdul Rahman Al-Warthan as Nizar
Jassim Al-Nabhan as Muttalib

English voice cast
Johnny Yong Bosch
Jennie Kwan
Bryce Papenbrook
Alejandro Saab
Christopher Sabat
Steve Blum
Hesham Elshazly
Cedric Williams
Hussein Mohammed
Mohammed Gaber

Production
The Journey, which was based on Pre-Islamic History, is a joint collaboration which began in November 2017 between two animation studios; Manga Productions of Saudi Arabia and Toei Animation of Japan. This film is the second animated work made by Manga in collaboration with Toei; with the first being animated series Future's Folktales. The Journey was directed by Kōbun Shizuno with Atsuhiro Tomioka providing the screenplay. The character design for the film was done by Tatsuro Iwamoto and musical score was by Kaoru Wada. Production work for The Journey was done both in Tokyo and Riyadh. The film project's cost ranges from $10–15 million. The film finished production by February 2020.

Release

Arabic release
The Journey was originally planned to make its premiere in 2020 at the Cannes Film Festival which was cancelled due to the COVID-19 pandemic.  The film was released in the Middle East and North Africa theaters on June 17, 2021. VOX Cinemas has theatrical rights for the film in the Middle East and North Africa region. The film is released in Arabic and Japanese with English Subtitles.

Japanese release
Toei subsidiary T-Joy had the distribution rights for the film in Japan, and later distributed by Toei Animation. The film was released in Japanese theaters on June 25, 2021.

North American release
The film was screened in Grauman's Chinese Theatre on April 12, 2022. That same day, it was announced that Crunchyroll would stream the film on their website this spring.

German release
The film was released with DVD and Blu-Ray in Germany on June 16, 2022. Amazon and Apple have started streaming the film in Germany.

Global release
Crunchyroll started to stream the film for North and South America, Asia and Europe on September 2, 2022.

Reception

The Journey grossed $55,940 at the box office.

Notes

References

External links
 (in Japanese)
 The Journey (Arabic) - VOX Cinemas
 The Journey (Japanese) - VOX Cinemas
 The Journey - Crunchyroll

2021 films
2021 anime films
2020s Arabic-language films
Anime postponed due to the COVID-19 pandemic
Films about battles and military operations
Films scored by Kaoru Wada
Japanese epic films
Saudi Arabian animated films
Toei Animation films
Yokohama Animation Laboratory